WXLO (104.5 FM; "104.5 XLO") is a hot adult contemporary radio station owned by Cumulus Media, licensed to Fitchburg, Massachusetts, and serving the Worcester and Boston markets. The station broadcasts on the FM band on a frequency of 104.5 MHz. The studio is located in downtown Worcester, and its transmission tower is located in the Leominster State Forest in Leominster.

The call sign WXLO was chosen in 1984 by station management in tribute to the former New York station (which is now WEPN-FM). In 1991, the call sign was changed to WXLO-FM, when WFGL 960 briefly changed its call sign to WXLO.  The station was reassigned the WXLO call sign by the Federal Communications Commission on June 5, 1997.

WXLO is often the most listened-to adult radio station in the Worcester market. WXLO also has a substantial audience in the Boston metro area, especially the area known as MetroWest. Outside the station's hot AC format, WXLO airs specialty programming, and the Awesome '80s Saturday Night. WXLO also spotlights that decade of music with an annual event known as the "Awesome '80s Prom".  WXLO also hosts an annual Acoustic Christmas event at Mechanics Hall in Worcester that has featured artists such as Train, Guster, Lee Dewyze, Daughtry, Delta Rae, Steven Page, Gavin DeGraw, Andy Grammer, and the Goo Goo Dolls.

On air personalities include Jen Carter and Frank Foley in the morning, Laura St. James, Rick Brackett, Diana "Lady D." Steele and Tim Brennan.

Booster signals
On January 15, 2019, WXLO launched three boosters, in Boston (with a transmitter at the John Hancock Tower), Lexington, and Waltham, to help improve its signal in the Greater Boston area.

References

External links

XLO
Cumulus Media radio stations
Radio stations established in 1960
Fitchburg, Massachusetts
Hot adult contemporary radio stations in the United States
1960 establishments in Massachusetts